A cantatorium is a collection of chants for the Mass and solo pieces for the Liturgy of the Word with simple congregational responses of graduals, alleluias, tracts or cantica. Examples include the Saint-Gall Cantatorium.

Bibliography
Cantatorium et antiphonale missarum, Ecclesia Orans, 1984. cited in : A history of liturgical books from the beginning to the thirteenth century, 1998, Éric Palazzo 
 Les Livres de chant liturgique, Michel Huglo, 1998.
The cantatorium: from Charlemagne to the Fourteenth century, Michel Huglo, 2001.

Western plainchant